Marl Hill is a historic home located near Talleysville, New Kent County, Virginia. The original section dates to the late-18th century, with the larger west addition built about 1825.  It is a two-story, five-bay, wood frame dwelling with Federal and Greek Revival style architectural features.  Also on the property are the contributing shed, woodshed, smokehouse, pumphouse, rootcellar, a historic well and boxwoods.  The property was once the site of a marl mining operation.

It was listed on the National Register of Historic Places in 1990.

References

Houses on the National Register of Historic Places in Virginia
Federal architecture in Virginia
Greek Revival houses in Virginia
Houses completed in 1825
Houses in New Kent County, Virginia
National Register of Historic Places in New Kent County, Virginia